Bluefields International Airport  is an airport serving Bluefields, a harbor city in the South Caribbean Coast Autonomous Region of Nicaragua. It is the busiest airport in the Caribbean coast of Nicaragua.

A new terminal was opened recently and extension of the runway is planned. Currently, the airport serves only domestic and small international destinations, but plans are to make it international in the future. Taxicab and bus service are available.

The airport is just south of the city on the Bluefields Bay shore. North approach and departure are over the water. The runway length includes a  displaced threshold on Runway 23.

The Bluefields VOR/DME (ident: BLU) is located on the airfield.

Airlines and destinations
{| class="wikitable"
|+
!Airlines
!Destinations
|-
|La Costena
|Managua (Augusto C Sandino Airport), Corn Islands (Corn Island Airport) & Puerto Cabezas (Puerto Cabezas Airport)
|}

Accidents and incidents
On 10 May 1982, two hijackers demanded a Curtiss-Wright C-46 Commando of Aeronica to leave its Bluefields-Corn Island route and land in Costa Rica instead. The pilots obeyed and landed at Limón International Airport in Costa Rica, where the perpetrators surrendered.
On July 20, 1999, a Cessna Grand Caravan operating as La Costeña flight 046 from Managua to Bluefields crashed into a remote hillside 50 km west of Bluefields when it descended prematurely, killing all 16 on board.
On December 19, 2007 a Short 360 of La Costeña Airlines struck a tire when attempting takeoff from Bluefields Airport. No-one was hurt.

See also

 List of airports in Nicaragua
 Transport in Nicaragua

References

External links
OpenStreetMap - Bluefields
SkyVector - Bluefields Airport
EAAI Profile

Airports in Nicaragua
South Caribbean Coast Autonomous Region